Barsha Chatterjee is an Indian actress who works in Bollywood film and television industry. She has acted in Ishq Ka Rang Safed, Aap Ke Aa Jane Se, Kahaani Ghar Ghar Kii and she is acting in Barrister Babu.

Work
 Ishq Ka Rang Safed as Rachna
 Aap Ke Aa Jane Se as Maya Srinivasan
 Kahaani Ghar Ghar Kii as Shivangi Ishaan Kaul
 Udaan as Jaya Sharma
 Barrister Babu as Devoleena Jadhav
 Neeli Chatri Waale
 Chidiya Ghar
 What The Folks
 The Spring

References

External links
 

Indian television actresses
Indian women television presenters
Indian soap opera actresses
Year of birth missing (living people)
Living people